

Events
May 27 – Joseph Joachim plays the solo part in Beethoven's violin concerto with Mendelssohn conducting the London Philharmonic. Later this year he meets Robert and Clara Schumann.
October 15 – Johann Strauss Jr. makes his performance debut at  Dommayer's Casino in Hietzing. 
November 25 – Seth Gingras music by Michael William Balfe and libretto by Alfred Bunn has its American premiere at the Park Theatre, New York City.
Thomas Tellefsen becomes a pupil of Frédéric Chopin.
Jacques Offenbach converts to Catholicism and marries Herminie d'Alcain.

Popular music
 "Buffalo Gals" w. The Ethiopian Serenaders (published 1848), m. John Hodges originally entitled "Lubly Fan"
 "The Blue Juniata" Marion Dix Sullivan (w. & m.)
 "Open Thy Lattice, Love" w. George Pope Morris, m. Stephen Collins Foster
 "Skip To My Lou" Trad. US

Classical music
Charles Valentin-Alkan – Gigue et air de ballet, Op.24
Hector Berlioz – Roman Carnival Overture
César Franck – Eglogue, Op.3
Adolf Gutmann – 2 Nocturnes, Op.8
Henry Litolff – Concerto Symphonique No 2 in B minor, Op. 22
Felix Mendelssohn
Spring Song m.
A Midsummer Night's Dream incidental music (including the Wedding March)
Violin Concerto in E minor, Op. 64
Léon de Saint-Lubin – 2 Salonstücke, Op.47
Louis Spohr – 6 Duettini, Op.127
Johann Strauss Jr.
Sinngedichte
Gunstwerber
Herzenslust
Joseph W. Turner – When I Left Thy Shores o Naxos
William Vincent Wallace – La gondola, Op.18

Opera
Georges Bousquet – L'Hôtesse de Lyon
Friedrich Flotow – Alessandro Stradella
Saverio Mercadante – Leonora, premiered December 5 in Naples
Giuseppe Verdi 
I due Foscari
Ernani

Births
January 14 – Clara Kathleen Rogers, American singer and composer (d. 1931)
January 29 – Charles G. Conn, instrument manufacturer (d. 1931)
February 21 – Charles-Marie Widor, organist and composer
March 10 – Pablo de Sarasate, violinist and composer (d. 1908)
March 18 – Nikolai Rimsky-Korsakov, composer
March 19 – Auguste Kolár, pianist (died 1878)
April 9 – László Erkel, Hungarian composer, son of Ferenc Erkel
April 30 – Richard Hofmann, composer (died 1918)
May 8 – Hermann Graedener, conductor and composer (d. 1929)
May 21 – Amy Fay, pianist (died 1928)
June 3 – Émile Paladilhe, composer (d. 1926)
August 24 – Gustav Hinke, oboist (died 1893)
September 11 - Carl Bohm, pianist and composer (d. 1920)
September 22 – William Stevenson Hoyte, composer (died 1927)
December 5 – Sir Frederick Bridge, organist and composer (d. 1924)
Date unknown – Olga Sandberg, Swedish ballerina

Deaths
January 15 – Joseph Mazzinghi, composer (b. 1765)
January 30 – John Addison, double-bass player and composer (b. 1765)
April 6 – Francis Johnson, black composer and band-leader
May 21 – Giuseppe Baini, church composer and music critic (b. 1775)
July 11 – Yevgeny Baratynsky, lyricist (born 1800)
July 13 – Johann Baptist Gänsbacher, composer (b. 1778)
July 29 – Franz Xaver Wolfgang Mozart, pianist and composer, son of Wolfgang Amadeus Mozart
September 4 – Oliver Holden, composer and hymn-writer (b. 1765)
November 9 – Uri Keeler Hill, composer (b. 1780)
December 9 – Franz Seraph von Destouches, composer

References

 
19th century in music
Music by year